Fogo Natural Park, on the island of Fogo, is one of ten "natural parks" in the country of Cape Verde. The natural park is situated in the interior of the island, and covers the volcano Pico do Fogo, its crater and crater rim (Bordeira) and the forest of Monte Velha. The volcano is active; the most recent eruption was in 2014-15.

Flora and fauna

The volcano area of Fogo is an Important Bird Area. Key bird species are Fea's petrel, Boyd's shearwater and Cape Verde swift. The ocean around the island of Fogo is another Important Bird Area covering .

The endemic plants Echium vulcanorum (endangered) and Erysimum caboverdeanum (critically endangered) are only found on the outer crater rim of the volcano of Fogo.

References 

National parks of Cape Verde
Geography of Fogo, Cape Verde